I. V. Subba Rao may refer to:
 I. V. Subba Rao (scientist)
 I. V. Subba Rao (civil servant)